Aileen Neilson (born 15 August 1971) is a Scottish wheelchair curler. She is the first woman to skip a wheelchair curling team in either the Paralympic Games (2010) or World Championships (2011).

Career
Although she comes from a family of curlers Neilson only took up the sport in 2004 at the age of 33. She subsequently made her international debut in 2006.

She was part of the Great Britain wheelchair curling team at the 2010 Paralympic Games in Vancouver, Canada.

She has a bronze medal from the 2007 World Wheelchair Curling Championship and a silver from the 2011 World Wheelchair Curling Championship.

She won a bronze medal at the 2014 Winter Paralympics at Sochi with the British team beating China 7–3 in the third-place play-off match.

She is a teacher at Bent Primary School in South Lanarkshire. Her partner is former teammate and predecessor as skip of the British Paralympic rink Michael McCreadie.

References

External links

 Video profile at BBC Sport
Profile at the Official Website for the 2010 Winter Paralympics in Vancouver

1971 births
Living people
Scottish female curlers
Scottish wheelchair curlers
Scottish Paralympic competitors
Scottish schoolteachers
Paralympic wheelchair curlers of Great Britain
Paralympic medalists in wheelchair curling
Paralympic bronze medalists for Great Britain
Wheelchair curlers at the 2010 Winter Paralympics
Wheelchair curlers at the 2014 Winter Paralympics
Wheelchair curlers at the 2018 Winter Paralympics
Medalists at the 2014 Winter Paralympics
Alumni of the University of the West of Scotland